Herbert Armstrong Bevard (born February 24, 1946) is an American prelate of the Roman Catholic Church who served as the bishop of the Diocese of Saint Thomas in the United States Virgin Islands from 2008 until 2020.

Biography

Early life 
Herbert Bevard was born in Baltimore, Maryland, on February 24, 1946.  He converted from Presbyterianism to Catholicism in 1964, when he was a high school senior.  After deciding to become a priest, Bevard entered St. Charles Borromeo Seminary in Wynnewood, Pennsylvania.

Bevard was ordained to the priesthood by Cardinal John Krol for the Archdiocese of Philadelphia in 1972.  Bevard was created monsignor in 2003 and was stationed in Philadelphia as episcopal vicar for the city's northern half.

Bishop of Saint Thomas
Bevard was appointed bishop of the Diocese of Saint Thomas in the Virgin Islands on July 7, 2008, by Pope Benedict XVI.  Bevard was consecrated on September 3 2008 in Charlotte Amelie at the Cathedral of Sts. Peter and Paul by Archbishop Donald Wuerl.  The principal co-consecrators were Archbishop Joseph Kurtz and Bishop Daniel Edward Thomas.

On July 6, 2020, aware of his deteriorating health, Bevard sent a letter of resignation as bishop to Pope Francis.  Soon after that, Bevard was hospitalized at Schneider Regional Medical Center in Charlotte Amalie.  In mid-August 2020, he was airlifted to a hospital in North Carolina for advanced treatment.  Pope Francis accepted Bevard's resignation on September 18, 2020, and appointed Archbishop Wilton Gregory from the Archdiocese of Washington to temporarily run the Diocese of St. Thomas as apostolic administrator. 

Bevard currently resides in Wilmington, North Carolina..

See also
 

 Catholic Church hierarchy
 Catholic Church in the United States
 Historical list of the Catholic bishops of the United States
 List of Catholic bishops of the United States
 Lists of patriarchs, archbishops, and bishops

References

External links

Diocese of St. Thomas in Virgin Islands
Bishop Hebert Armstrong Bevard at Catholic-Hierarchy.org 

Roman Catholic bishops of Saint Thomas
Converts to Roman Catholicism from Calvinism
21st-century Roman Catholic bishops in the United States
Living people
1946 births
American Roman Catholic bishops by contiguous area of the United States